This is a list of monuments in Valletta, Malta, which are listed on the National Inventory of the Cultural Property of the Maltese Islands.

List 

|}

References

Valletta
Buildings and structures in Valletta
History of Valletta